Lowton East is an electoral ward in Leigh, England. It forms part of Wigan Metropolitan Borough Council, as well as the parliamentary constituency of Leigh.

Councillors 
, the ward is represented by three Conservative councillors: Marie Cooper, Edward Houlton and Kathleen Houlton. A previous councillor was James Grundy, who in 2019 became the Conservative MP for the constituency, having been first elected to Lowton East in 2008.

References

Wigan Metropolitan Borough Council Wards